Dichopogon is a genus of perennial herbs, native to Australia and New Guinea.  It is included in the genus Arthropodium by some authorities, although recognized as a distinct genus by others. In the APG III classification system, it is placed in the family Asparagaceae, subfamily Lomandroideae (formerly the family Laxmanniaceae).

The name is derived from the Greek words δίχα (dicha, "duplicate") and πώγων (pogon, "barb").

Species
Dichopogon capillipes (Endl.) Brittan - Western Australia
Dichopogon fimbriatus (R.Br.) J.F.Macbr. = Arthropodium fimbriatum R.Br.  - New South Wales, South Australia, Victoria, Western Australia
Dichopogon preissii (Endl.) Brittan  - Western Australia
Dichopogon strictus (R.Br.) Baker = Arthropodium strictum R.Br. New Guinea, New South Wales, South Australia, Victoria
Dichopogon tyleri Brittan - Western Australia

References

Asparagaceae genera
Lomandroideae